Rhytidanthera is a genus of flowering plants belonging to the family Ochnaceae.

Its native range is Colombia.

Species:

Rhytidanthera magnifica 
Rhytidanthera splendida

References

Ochnaceae
Malpighiales genera